{{DISPLAYTITLE:C17H18N2O2}}
The molecular formula C17H18N2O2 (molar mass: 282.337 g/mol) may refer to:

 Lysergic acid methyl ester
 Salpn ligand

Molecular formulas